The 2015–16 season is Olimpija's 7th season in the Slovenian PrvaLiga, Slovenian top division, since the league was created.

Players
As of 1 March 2016.

Source:NK Olimpija

Competitions

PrvaLiga

League table

Results summary

Results by round

Matches

Cup

First round

Round of 16

Quarter-finals

Statistics

See also
2015–16 Slovenian PrvaLiga
2015–16 Slovenian Football Cup

References

External links
Official website 
Twitter profile
Green dragons – Supporters 
PrvaLiga profile 
UEFA profile
Soccerway profile

NK Olimpija Ljubljana (2005) seasons
Olimpija